Robert Devens, Jr. (born May 20, 1972) is an American former professional tennis player.

Born in New York City, Devens played collegiate tennis for Stanford University and was a member of the 1992 NCAA championship team. He competed briefly on the professional tour and earned a top-200 ranking in doubles. As a doubles player he had an ATP Tour main draw appearance at Kitzbühel in 1995 and won one ATP Challenger title.

ATP Challenger finals

Doubles: 1 (1–0)

References

External links
 
 

1972 births
Living people
American male tennis players
Stanford Cardinal men's tennis players
Tennis people from New York (state)
Sportspeople from New York City